This is a list of electronic literature authors and works (that originate from digital environments), and its critics. Electronic literature is a literary genre consisting of works of literature that originate within digital environments. It can also be defined as those works using a digital element as an integral part of the work (essential to convey the meaning of the piece). This list is specific and exclusive to literature and works originally published electronically, and does not include works published in book format only, web blogs, newspapers, directories, etc. However, this list may include works that have been published both electronically and in print.

Authors

 Amy Briggs 
 Annie Abrahams
 Mabel Addis
 Anna Anthropy
 Robert Arellano
 Kate Armstrong
 Jean-Pierre Balpe
 Alan Bigelow
 Amaranth Borsuk
 Serge Bouchardon
 Mez Breeze
 Nancy Buchanan
 J.R. Carpenter
 John Cayley
 Lynda Clark
 Robert Coover
 Caterina Davinio
 Claire Dinsmore
 J. Yellowlees Douglas
 Jacek Dukaj
 Tina Escaja
 Caitlin Fisher
 Mary Flanagan
 Belén Gache
 Loss Pequeño Glazier
 Samantha Gorman
 Dene Grigar
 Juan B. Gutierrez
 Dan Hett
 Richard Holeton
 Elliott Holt
 Jeremy Hight
 Andrew Hussie
 Shelley Jackson
 David Jhave Johnston
 Michael Joyce
 Eduardo Kac
 Yael Kanarek
 Robert Kendall
 Norman M. Klein
 Allison Knowles
 Deena Larsen
 Olia Lialina
 Marjorie Luesebrink pseudonym M.D. Coverley
 Kathy Mac
 Jackson Mac Low
 Talan Memmott
 Judy Malloy
 Cathy Marshall
 Yucef Merhi
 María Mencía
 Stuart Moulthrop
 Nick Montfort
 Jason Nelson
 Philip M. Parker
 Allison Parrish
 Milorad Pavić
 Judith Pintar
 Kate Pullinger
 Zoë Quinn
 Melinda Rackham
 Scott Rettberg
 Emily Short
 Sarah Smith
 Alan Sondheim
 Brian Kim Stefans
 Stephanie Strickland
 Gianni Toti
 Camille Utterback
Helen Varley Jamieson 
 Vincent Volckaert
 Noah Wardrip-Fruin
 Rae White
 Adrianne Wortzel
 Young-Hae Chang Heavy Industries
 Jody Zellen

Critics

 Espen J. Aarseth
 Jay David Bolter
 John Cayley
 Robert Coover
 Johanna Drucker
 Caterina Davinio
 J. Yellowlees Douglas
 Astrid Ensslin
 Loss Pequeño Glazier
 N. Katherine Hayles
 David Jhave Johnston
 Lisbeth Klastrup
 George Landow
 Lev Manovich
 Stuart Moulthrop
 Janet Murray
 Jessica Pressman
 Scott Rettberg
 Jill Walker Rettberg
 Marie-Laure Ryan
 Roberto Simanowski

Works

Journals and collected works
The Digital Review ia an annual publication of literary criticism of electronic literature/born digital works. https://thedigitalreview.com/index.html
 The Electronic Literature Organization has collected notable works of electronic literature in four collections at https://collection.eliterature.org/
The Electronic Literature Knowledge Base (ELMCIP) is a research resource for electronic literature, with 3,851 entries as of September 2, 2022.
 The New River Anthology: A Journal of Digital Art and Literature at https://thenewriver.us/ has been publishing electronic literature continually since 1996. 
trAce Online Writing Centre's journal, frAme, issued 34 works of electronic literature in 6 issues of its journal, frAme. which is now restored at the Washington State University's NeXt Museum.
Turbulence was a New Media Journal from 1996 to 2006

Publishers
Eastgate Systems/Mark Bernstein

Titles
See :Category:Electronic literature works
 Afternoon, a story, Michael Joyce (writer) (1987, 1990)
 Victory Garden (1992)
 Patchwork Girl (1995)
 Califia, Marjorie Luesebrink M.D. Coverley 
Egypt: The book of Going Forth by Day Marjorie Luesebrink M.D. Coverley 
The Unknown by William Gillespie, Scott Rettberg, and Dirk Stratton (1999)
Lexia to Perplexia by Talan Memmott (2000)
These Waves of Girls by Caitlin Fisher (2001)
 The Imaginary 20th Century (2016)
 Poesie Elettroniche (2016)
 Notes Toward Absolute Zero (1995)
 Déprise (2010)
 Figurski at Findhorn on Acid (2001, 2021)
 'Game, game, game and again game (2008), Nothing you have done deserves such praise (2013), I made this. you play this. we are enemies (2009), and Scrape Scraperteeth (2011) are important examples of the intersection of games and poetry. Jason Nelson
 ReRites by David Jhave Johnston (2019)

Awards

Woollahra Digital Literary Award 
Annual national Award in Woollahra, Australia.given since 2017. The winners are announced at the Woohlahara Library at Double Bay, near Sydney Australia. There is a prize pool of $7,500 Australian dollars for 2022 prizes. The awards are given to literary works that are "digitally born," which they define as published online or electronically. There are now prizes for digital innovation, which support the possibilities in electronic literature (works that use a function of the computer itself as an integral part of the meaning). These works of electronic literature won awards:

2021 
 Digital Innovation: David Henley, The Collapse (electronic literature, digital experimental format)
 Readers’ Choice Award: Heidi Sfiligoi, I Am Water (digital poem with visuals)

2020
 Readers’ Choice Award: Mez Breeze, Perpetual Nomads (electronic literature, digital experimental format)

2019 
 Poetry: Jason Nelson, Nine Billion Branches (electronic literature, digital experimental format)

Early Prototype Hypertext Writers
Hypertext involves works that incorporate extra elements, such as visual or aural components, as an integral part of the work. Proto-electronic literature writers include:
 Theresa Hak Kyung Cha

Further reading
 Hayles, N. Katherine. Electronic Literature: New Horizons for the Literary. Notre Dame: University of Notre Dame Press, 2008.
 Scott Rettberg. 2018. Electronic Literature. Cambridge: Polity Press. 
 Jörgen Schäfer, Peter Gendolla (eds.), Beyond the Screen. Transformations of Literary Structures, Interfaces and Genres. Bielefeld: Transcript, 2010.
 Roberto Simanowski, Jörgen Schäfer, Peter Gendolla (eds.), Reading Moving Letters. Digital Literature in Research and Teaching: A Handbook. Bielefeld: Transcript, 2010.
 Peter Gendolla, Jörgen Schäfer (eds.), The Aesthetics of Net Literature. Writing, Reading and Playing in Programmable Media. Bielefeld: Transcript, 2007.
 Caterina Davinio, Tecno-Poesia e realtà virtuali (Techno-Poetry and Virtual Realities), Preface by Eugenio Miccini, Collection Archivio della Poesia del '900, Sometti, Mantova, 2002.
 Giovanna Di Rosario, OLE Officina di Letteratura Elettronica - Lavori del Convegno, Atelier Multimediale edizioni, Napoli 2011.
 Azzurra Collas, Susy Decosta, Atmaxenia Ghia, Sunrise Jefferson, Asian Lednev, Margye Ryba, Piega Tuqiri, Aldous Writer, MacEwan Writer, La Torre di Asian - Concept book di Fabio Fornasari sul romanzo collettivo La Torre di Asian, a cura di Lorenza Colicigno, Fabio Fornasari, Giuseppe Iannicelli, Tipografia Tonelli Bologna, gennaio 2010.

See also
Electronic Literature
List of women electronic writers
 Electronic Literature Organization

References

 
Literature lists